Henry Robert Nicollon des Abbayes (15 July 1898 – 21 May 1974) was a French botanist and lichenologist. He was the chair of the Botanical Department of the University of Rennes and an expert on the flora of Great Britain.

References

External links 
 Photo from the Lichen Herbarium of the University of Rennes
 Lichen Herbarium "Prof. des Abbayes" in Rennes

1898 births
1974 deaths
20th-century French botanists
French lichenologists
Academic staff of the University of Rennes